Canterbury's Law is an American legal drama television series, which aired from March 10 to April 18, 2008 as a mid-season replacement on Fox. The show was created by Dave Erickson and executive produced by Denis Leary, Jim Serpico, Walon Green, John Kane, and Mike Figgis, who also directed the pilot. The series revolved around Elizabeth Canterbury (portrayed by Julianna Margulies), a rebellious defense attorney willing to bend the law if it protects the wrongfully accused. A rising star, she puts her career on the line to take on risky and unpopular cases, even when they take a toll on her personal life.

Produced by Sony Pictures Television and Apostle, the series aired Mondays at 9:00 pm and was broadcast in Australia and Canada on Nine Network and Global respectively. Due to the 2007–2008 Writers Guild of America strike, only six of the 13 episodes ordered were able to be produced.

On March 20, 2008, Fox announced that Canterbury's Law would move to the Friday 9:00 pm slot for the remaining episodes.

On May 15, 2008, Fox officially canceled the series.

Plot
Elizabeth and her law professor husband, Matthew (Aidan Quinn), are both haunted by the disappearance of their young son (Jeremy Zorek) and have just settled in Providence, Rhode Island, in an attempt to distance themselves from the tragedy and put their relationship back together. But even as they try to move on beyond the tragedy, those goals become elusive whenever Elizabeth's work provides a stark reminder of the justice absent in their own lives.

At work, Elizabeth must also deal with coworkers Russell Krauss (Ben Shenkman), a former district attorney, who was forced out of his job by his financially strapped boss and whose knowledge will guide Elizabeth in their cases, even if she doesn't want to hear his reasoning or logic; Chester Fields (Keith Robinson), a congressman's son who wants to distance himself from his political family; and Molly McConnell (Trieste Dunn), a headstrong individual who's not afraid to switch sides, even if it's against Elizabeth.

Frank Angstrom (James McCaffrey) is a private investigator with whom Elizabeth has a sometime affair.

Cast

Main characters
 Julianna Margulies as Elizabeth Canterbury
 Ben Shenkman as Russell Krauss
 Trieste Dunn as Molly McConnell
 Keith Robinson as Chester Fields
 Terry Kinney as Deputy Attorney General Zach Williams
 Aidan Quinn as Matthew "Matt" Furey
 James McCaffrey as Frank Angstrom

Recurring characters
 David Call as Martin, the receptionist

Jocko Sims was originally cast as Chester Fields but the role was re-cast in June 2007. Linus Roache was also replaced by Aidan Quinn in August 2007 after the former landed a regular starring role in Law & Order.

Episodes

References

External links
 

2008 American television series debuts
2008 American television series endings
2000s American crime drama television series
2000s American legal television series
Fox Broadcasting Company original programming
Television series by Sony Pictures Television
Television shows set in Rhode Island
Television shows filmed in New York (state)
English-language television shows